Enrique Padilla (born 23 August 1934) is a Mexican modern pentathlete. He competed at the 1964 Summer Olympics.

References

1934 births
Living people
Mexican male modern pentathletes
Olympic modern pentathletes of Mexico
Modern pentathletes at the 1964 Summer Olympics